The Adirondack-class command ship was a ship class of command ships of the United States Navy during World War II and the Cold War. All 3 ships were converted from the Type C2-S-AJ1 cargo ships.

Development 
Three type C2 cargo ships were converted into command ships for the United States Navy throughout the later stages of World War II. After the war, all were modernized with new radars and decommissioned by 1969 to later be scrapped.

The ship's hull remained nearly the same but with new equipment to carry out her purpose now placed on deck alongside several cranes. The ships' armaments had been slightly changed and relocated in order for the ships to carry out their new roles. All ships served in the Pacific Theater until the end of the war with no ships lost in combat.

Ships in the class

References 
  - lead ship of the class (other AGC ships listed as well)
 United States Navy. 1959-1991. Dictionary of American Naval Fighting Ships.
 Thomas Jane, Frederick. 1974. Jane's Fighting Ships. Sampson Low, Marston and Company.
 2002. U.S. Amphibious Ships and Craft: An Illustrated Design History. Annapolis: Naval Institute Press. .

Ships built in Wilmington, North Carolina
Command ships of the United States Navy
Auxiliary ship classes of the United States Navy
World War II auxiliary ships of the United States
Cold War amphibious warfare vessels of the United States
Adirondack-class command ships